The Sts. Peter and Paul Cathedral also called Šiauliai Cathedral is a religious building of the Catholic Church that serves as the cathedral in Šiauliai, a city in northern Lithuania, and the seat of the Roman Catholic Diocese of Šiauliai.

History
The Church of Saints Peter and Paul was built in the seventeenth century, between 1617 and 1626, and is a significant example of the Renaissance and Mannerism. In 1880, lightning struck a tower, so it was necessary to make repairs. The most significant damage occurred after World War II. In 1944 the church was in a sorry state, but already during the Soviet era, the church was restored.

Simultaneously with the creation of the Diocese of Siauliai on May 28, 1997, the Church of Saints Peter and Paul was elevated to the status of cathedral by Pope John Paul II.

See also
Roman Catholicism in Lithuania
Sts. Peter and Paul Cathedral

References

Roman Catholic cathedrals in Lithuania
Buildings and structures in Šiauliai
Roman Catholic churches completed in 1626
Objects listed in Lithuanian Registry of Cultural Property
17th-century Roman Catholic church buildings in Lithuania